The West Bengal State Assembly Election of 1952 was a part of the series of Legislative Assembly elections in 1952.

Alliances
On the political left, two alliances had emerged the United Socialist Organisation of India (an alliance between the Communist Party of India, the Socialist Republican Party and the Forward Bloc (Marxist Group)) and the People's United Socialist Front (comprising the Socialist Party, the Forward Bloc (Ruikar) and the Revolutionary Communist Party of India).

Results

Alliance wise result

The election was won by the Indian National Congress, who got a majority of its own in the assembly. The communists became the largest opposition party.

Party wise result

|- style="background-color:#E9E9E9; text-align:center;"
! class="unsortable" |
! Political party !! Flag !! Seats  Contested !! Won !! % of  Seats !! Votes !! Vote %
|- style="background: #90EE90;"
| 
| style="text-align:left;" |Indian National Congress
| 
| 236 || 150 || 63.56 || 2,889,994 || 38.82
|-
| 
| style="text-align:left;" |Kisan Mazdoor Praja Party
|
| 129 || 15 || 6.36 || 667,446 || 8.97
|-
| 
| style="text-align:left;" |Communist Party of India
| 
| 86 || 28 || 11.86 || 800,951 || 10.76
|-
| 
| style="text-align:left;" |Bharatiya Jana Sangh
|
| 85 || 9 || 3.81 || 415,458 || 5.58
|-
| 
| style="text-align:left;" |Forward Bloc (Marxist Group)
|
| 48 || 11 || 4.66 || 393,591 || 5.29
|-
|
| style="text-align:left;" |Socialist Party
|
| 63 || 0 ||  || 215,382 || 2.89
|-
| 
| style="text-align:left;" |Akhil Bharatiya Hindu Mahasabha
|
| 33 || 4 || 1.69 || 1,76,762 || 2.37
|-
|
| style="text-align:left;" |Forward Bloc (Ruikar)
|
| 32 || 2 || 0.85 || 1,07,905 || 1.45
|-
|
| style="text-align:left;" |Revolutionary Socialist Party
|
| 16 || 0 ||  || 63,173 || 0.85
|-
|
| style="text-align:left;" |Revolutionary Communist Party of India (Tagore)
| 
| 10 || 0 ||  || 32,859 || 0.44
|-
|
| style="text-align:left;" |Bolshevik Party of India
| 
| 8 || 0 ||  || 20117 || 0.27
|-
|
| style="text-align:left;" |Akhil Bharatiya Ram Rajya Parishad
|
|14 || 0 ||  || 7,100 || 0.10
|-
| 
|
| 614 || 19 || 8.05 || 1,653,165 || 22.21
|- class="unsortable" style="background-color:#E9E9E9"
! colspan = 3| Total seats
! 238 !! style="text-align:center;" |Voters !! 17,628,239 !! style="text-align:center;" |Turnout !! 7,443,903 (42.23%)
|}

Elected members

State Reorganization
On 1 November 1956, under States Reorganisation Act, 1956, a portion of the Purnea district east of the river Mahananda and the Purulia sub-district of the Manbhum district in the south (except Char Thana) were transferred from Bihar to West Bengal. Thus, assembly constituencies in West Bengal increased from 187 (238 seats) to 195 (252 seats) during 1957 assembly elections.

See also
 1951–52 elections in India
 1957 West Bengal Legislative Assembly election

References

State Assembly elections in West Bengal
1950s in West Bengal
West Bengal
March 1952 events in Asia